The Jamaican red bat (Lasiurus degelidus) is a species of vesper bat. It is endemic to Jamaica.

This is one of the least well-known species of bats in Jamaica. No specimens have been recorded from within caves or near caves so this appears to be a tree-roosting bat. It is caught over water.

References

Lasiurus
Bats of the Caribbean
Endemic fauna of Jamaica
Mammals of Jamaica
Mammals described in 1931